Springhill is a ghost town in Decatur County, Indiana, in the United States.

History
A post office was established as Spring Hill in 1827, and it remained in operation until it was discontinued in 1901.

References

Geography of Decatur County, Indiana